The 1st constituency of Ardèche is a French legislative constituency in the Ardèche département.

Deputies

Election results

2022

 
 
 
 
 
|-
| colspan="8" bgcolor="#E9E9E9"|
|-

2017

2012

|- style="background-color:#E9E9E9;text-align:center;"
! colspan="2" rowspan="2" style="text-align:left;" | Candidate
! rowspan="2" colspan="2" style="text-align:left;" | Party
! colspan="2" | 1st round
! colspan="2" | 2nd round
|- style="background-color:#E9E9E9;text-align:center;"
! width="75" | Votes
! width="30" | %
! width="75" | Votes
! width="30" | %
|-
| style="background-color:" |
| style="text-align:left;" | Pascal Terrasse
| style="text-align:left;" | Socialist Party
| PS
| 
| 45.13%
| 
| 67.20%
|-
| style="background-color:" |
| style="text-align:left;" | Christian Grangis
| style="text-align:left;" | National Front
| FN
| 
| 20.20%
| 
| 32.80%
|-
| style="background-color:" |
| style="text-align:left;" | Guérin de Longevialle
| style="text-align:left;" | Miscellaneous Right
| DVD
| 
| 15.60%
| colspan="2" style="text-align:left;" |
|-
| style="background-color:" |
| style="text-align:left;" | François Jacquart
| style="text-align:left;" | Left Front
| FG
| 
| 9.45%
| colspan="2" style="text-align:left;" |
|-
| style="background-color:" |
| style="text-align:left;" | Stéphane Oriol
| style="text-align:left;" | The Greens
| VEC
| 
| 4.50%
| colspan="2" style="text-align:left;" |
|-
| style="background-color:" |
| style="text-align:left;" | André Dupont
| style="text-align:left;" | 
| CEN
| 
| 3.11%
| colspan="2" style="text-align:left;" |
|-
| style="background-color:" |
| style="text-align:left;" | Gilles Bas
| style="text-align:left;" | Ecologist
| ECO
| 
| 0.86%
| colspan="2" style="text-align:left;" |
|-
| style="background-color:" |
| style="text-align:left;" | Patricia Soncini-Syren
| style="text-align:left;" | Far Left
| EXG
| 
| 0.65%
| colspan="2" style="text-align:left;" |
|-
| style="background-color:" |
| style="text-align:left;" | Muriel Vander Donckt
| style="text-align:left;" | Far Left
| EXG
| 
| 0.50%
| colspan="2" style="text-align:left;" |
|-
| style="background-color:" |
| style="text-align:left;" | François Martigny
| style="text-align:left;" | Other
| AUT
| 
| 0.00%
| colspan="2" style="text-align:left;" |
|-
| colspan="8" style="background-color:#E9E9E9;"|
|- style="font-weight:bold"
| colspan="4" style="text-align:left;" | Total
| 
| 100%
| 
| 100%
|-
| colspan="8" style="background-color:#E9E9E9;"|
|-
| colspan="4" style="text-align:left;" | Registered voters
| 
| style="background-color:#E9E9E9;"|
| 
| style="background-color:#E9E9E9;"|
|-
| colspan="4" style="text-align:left;" | Blank/Void ballots
| 
| 2.69%
| 
| 7.71%
|-
| colspan="4" style="text-align:left;" | Turnout
| 
| 60.55%
| 
| 58.04%
|-
| colspan="4" style="text-align:left;" | Abstentions
| 
| 39.45%
| 
| 41.96%
|-
| colspan="8" style="background-color:#E9E9E9;"|
|- style="font-weight:bold"
| colspan="6" style="text-align:left;" | Result
| colspan="2" style="background-color:" | PS HOLD
|}

2007

|- style="background-color:#E9E9E9;text-align:center;"
! colspan="2" rowspan="2" style="text-align:left;" | Candidate
! rowspan="2" colspan="2" style="text-align:left;" | Party
! colspan="2" | 1st round
! colspan="2" | 2nd round
|- style="background-color:#E9E9E9;text-align:center;"
! width="75" | Votes
! width="30" | %
! width="75" | Votes
! width="30" | %
|-
| style="background-color:" |
| style="text-align:left;" | Pascal Terrasse
| style="text-align:left;" | Socialist Party
| PS
| 
| 43.43%
| 
| 61.67%
|-
| style="background-color:" |
| style="text-align:left;" | Rachel Cotta
| style="text-align:left;" | Union for a Popular Movement
| UMP
| 
| 29.94%
| 
| 38.33%
|-
| style="background-color:" |
| style="text-align:left;" | Robert Cotta
| style="text-align:left;" | Communist
| COM
| 
| 6.02%
| colspan="2" style="text-align:left;" |
|-
| style="background-color:" |
| style="text-align:left;" | Jean-Yves Imbert
| style="text-align:left;" | Democratic Movement
| MoDem
| 
| 4.96%
| colspan="2" style="text-align:left;" |
|-
| style="background-color:" |
| style="text-align:left;" | Christiane Bertheas
| style="text-align:left;" | National Front
| FN
| 
| 4.07%
| colspan="2" style="text-align:left;" |
|-
| style="background-color:" |
| style="text-align:left;" | Christian Lavis
| style="text-align:left;" | Majorité Presidentielle
| 
| 
| 2.92%
| colspan="2" style="text-align:left;" |
|-
| style="background-color:" |
| style="text-align:left;" | Cécile Moulain
| style="text-align:left;" | Far Left
| EXG
| 
| 2.28%
| colspan="2" style="text-align:left;" |
|-
| style="background-color:" |
| style="text-align:left;" | Yvette Noilly
| style="text-align:left;" | The Greens
| VEC
| 
| 2.25%
| colspan="2" style="text-align:left;" |
|-
| style="background-color:" |
| style="text-align:left;" | Marjorie Brottes
| style="text-align:left;" | Hunting, Fishing, Nature, Traditions
| CPNT
| 
| 1.94%
| colspan="2" style="text-align:left;" |
|-
| style="background-color:" |
| style="text-align:left;" | Nadège le Toux
| style="text-align:left;" | Movement for France
| MPF
| 
| 0.78%
| colspan="2" style="text-align:left;" |
|-
| style="background-color:" |
| style="text-align:left;" | Gilles Bas
| style="text-align:left;" | Divers
| DIV
| 
| 0.65%
| colspan="2" style="text-align:left;" |
|-
| style="background-color:" |
| style="text-align:left;" | Christian Prada
| style="text-align:left;" | Far Left
| EXG
| 
| 0.49%
| colspan="2" style="text-align:left;" |
|-
| style="background-color:" |
| style="text-align:left;" | Anne Alirol
| style="text-align:left;" | Regionalist
| REG
| 
| 0.24%
| colspan="2" style="text-align:left;" |
|-
| style="background-color:" |
| style="text-align:left;" | Marie-Odile le Gorgeu
| style="text-align:left;" | Divers
| DIV
| 
| 0.00%
| colspan="2" style="text-align:left;" |
|-
| colspan="8" style="background-color:#E9E9E9;"|
|- style="font-weight:bold"
| colspan="4" style="text-align:left;" | Total
| 
| 100%
| 
| 100%
|-
| colspan="8" style="background-color:#E9E9E9;"|
|-
| colspan="4" style="text-align:left;" | Registered voters
| 
| style="background-color:#E9E9E9;"|
| 
| style="background-color:#E9E9E9;"|
|-
| colspan="4" style="text-align:left;" | Blank/Void ballots
| 
| 1.54%
| 
| 2.24%
|-
| colspan="4" style="text-align:left;" | Turnout
| 
| 64.27%
| 
| 64.41%
|-
| colspan="4" style="text-align:left;" | Abstentions
| 
| 35.73%
| 
| 35.59%
|-
| colspan="8" style="background-color:#E9E9E9;"|
|- style="font-weight:bold"
| colspan="6" style="text-align:left;" | Result
| colspan="2" style="background-color:" | PS HOLD
|}

2002

|- style="background-color:#E9E9E9;text-align:center;"
! colspan="2" rowspan="2" style="text-align:left;" | Candidate
! rowspan="2" colspan="2" style="text-align:left;" | Party
! colspan="2" | 1st round
! colspan="2" | 2nd round
|- style="background-color:#E9E9E9;text-align:center;"
! width="75" | Votes
! width="30" | %
! width="75" | Votes
! width="30" | %
|-
| style="background-color:" |
| style="text-align:left;" | Pascal Terrasse
| style="text-align:left;" | Socialist Party
| PS
| 
| 37.68%
| 
| 54.45%
|-
| style="background-color:" |
| style="text-align:left;" | Michel Valla
| style="text-align:left;" | Union for a Popular Movement
| UMP
| 
| 34.42%
| 
| 45.55%
|-
| style="background-color:" |
| style="text-align:left;" | Jean Joel Vanhove
| style="text-align:left;" | National Front
| FN
| 
| 11.10%
| colspan="2" style="text-align:left;" |
|-
| style="background-color:" |
| style="text-align:left;" | Elsa Cayron
| style="text-align:left;" | Communist
| COM
| 
| 5.17%
| colspan="2" style="text-align:left;" |
|-
| style="background-color:" |
| style="text-align:left;" | Marie-Christine Git
| style="text-align:left;" | Hunting, Fishing, Nature, Traditions
| CPNT
| 
| 3.07%
| colspan="2" style="text-align:left;" |
|-
| style="background-color:" |
| style="text-align:left;" | Stephane Oriol
| style="text-align:left;" | The Greens
| VEC
| 
| 2.23%
| colspan="2" style="text-align:left;" |
|-
| style="background-color:" |
| style="text-align:left;" | Cecile Moulain
| style="text-align:left;" | Revolutionary Communist League
| LCR
| 
| 1.75%
| colspan="2" style="text-align:left;" |
|-
| style="background-color:" |
| style="text-align:left;" | Francis Jean
| style="text-align:left;" | Far Right
| EXD
| 
| 1.16%
| colspan="2" style="text-align:left;" |
|-
| style="background-color:" |
| style="text-align:left;" | Genevieve Suppa
| style="text-align:left;" | Divers
| DIV
| 
| 0.82%
| colspan="2" style="text-align:left;" |
|-
| style="background-color: " |
| style="text-align:left;" | Christian Prada
| style="text-align:left;" | Workers’ Struggle
| LO
| 
| 0.75%
| colspan="2" style="text-align:left;" |
|-
| style="background-color:" |
| style="text-align:left;" | Catherine Martin
| style="text-align:left;" | National Republican Movement
| MNR
| 
| 0.74%
| colspan="2" style="text-align:left;" |
|-
| style="background-color:" |
| style="text-align:left;" | Nicole Juven
| style="text-align:left;" | Movement for France
| MPF
| 
| 0.58%
| colspan="2" style="text-align:left;" |
|-
| style="background-color:" |
| style="text-align:left;" | Herve Salone
| style="text-align:left;" | Ecologist
| ECO
| 
| 0.27%
| colspan="2" style="text-align:left;" |
|-
| style="background-color:" |
| style="text-align:left;" | Marie-Ange Revire
| style="text-align:left;" | Miscellaneous Right
| DVD
| 
| 0.27%
| colspan="2" style="text-align:left;" |
|-
| colspan="8" style="background-color:#E9E9E9;"|
|- style="font-weight:bold"
| colspan="4" style="text-align:left;" | Total
| 
| 100%
| 
| 100%
|-
| colspan="8" style="background-color:#E9E9E9;"|
|-
| colspan="4" style="text-align:left;" | Registered voters
| 
| style="background-color:#E9E9E9;"|
| 
| style="background-color:#E9E9E9;"|
|-
| colspan="4" style="text-align:left;" | Blank/Void ballots
| 
| 1.92%
| 
| 3.29%
|-
| colspan="4" style="text-align:left;" | Turnout
| 
| 68.86%
| 
| 66.35%
|-
| colspan="4" style="text-align:left;" | Abstentions
| 
| 31.14%
| 
| 33.65%
|-
| colspan="8" style="background-color:#E9E9E9;"|
|- style="font-weight:bold"
| colspan="6" style="text-align:left;" | Result
| colspan="2" style="background-color:" | PS HOLD
|}

1997

 
 
 
 
 
 
 
 
 
 

 
 
 
 
 

*UDF dissident

Sources

 French Interior Ministry results website: 

1